{| 
|+Teutonia

{{Infobox ship career
|Hide header=
|Ship country=
|Ship registry=* (1856–71)
 Hamburg, Germany (1871–77)
 Liverpool, United Kingdom (1877–82)
 Cardiff (1882–84)
  (1884–89)
|Ship name=*Teutonia (1856–84)
Regina (1884–89)
Piemontese (1889–90)Città di Savona (1890–91)Mentana (1891–94)
|Ship owner=*Hamburg Brazilianische Packetschiffahrt Gesellschaft (1856–58)
Hamburg Amerika Line (1858–77)
Henry Flinn (1877–78)
Mississippi and Dominion Steamship Co (1878–82)
T Barker (1882–84)
Mississippi and Dominion Steamship Co (1884)
Francesco Costa (1884–91)
Schiaffino (1891–91)
|Ship operator=As owner, except Dominion Steamship Co (1877–78)
|Ship identification=United Kingdom Official Number 76476 (1877–84)
|Ship ordered=
|Ship builder=Caird & Company
|Ship yard number=48
|Ship original cost=
|Ship laid down=
|Ship launched=4 October 1856
|Ship acquired=
|Ship commissioned=
|Ship decommissioned=
|Ship in service=
|Ship maiden voyage=20 December 1856
|Ship out of service=
|Ship renamed=
|Ship struck=
|Ship reinstated=
|Ship honours=
|Ship honors=
|Ship captured=
|Ship fate=Scrapped 1894
|Ship notes=
}}

|}Teutonia was a screw steamer that was built by Caird & Company, Greenock, Renfrewshire, Scotland for the Hamburg Brazilianische Packetschiffahrt Gesellschaft in 1856. It later served with the Hamburg Amerika Line before being sold to British owners in 1877 and Italian owners in 1884, serving them under the names Regina, Piemontese, Città di Savona and Mentana The ship was scrapped in 1894.

Description
It was a 2,693 gross ton ship. A 350hp steam engine drove a single screw propeller. Also propelled by sails, the ship was rigged as a barque. The ship had accommodation for 50 first class, 135 second class and 310 third class passengers.

Career
The ship was built as yard number 48 by Caird and Company at its Cartsdyke Mid Yard in Greenock, Renfrewshire, United Kingdom for the Hamburg Brazilianische Packetschiffahrt Gesellschaft. Its port of registry was Hamburg. The ship was launched on 4 October 1856. It sailed from Hamburg on its maiden voyage on 20 December for Southampton, Hampshire, United Kingdom then Lisbon, Portugal, Pernambuco, Bahia and Rio de Janeiro, Empire of Brazil. On 7 March 1857, Teutonia collided with the British schooner Smuggler in the Bay of Biscay whilst on a voyage from Brazil to Southampton, United Kingdom. Smuggler sank with the loss of four crew. The captain of Smuggler was the only survivor. On 10 January 1858, she rescued the crew of the French barque Louis Armand, which had sprung a leak in the Atlantic Ocean and was sinking.

In 1858, the ship was sold to the Hamburg Amerika Line. In 1862, a new compound steam engine was installed. On 2 June 1860, Teutonia ran aground on the Brambles, in the Solent. She was refloated after two hours. In January 1869, she collided with the steamship A. G. Brown in the Mississippi River, sinking her.

In 1877, Teutonia was sold to Henry Flinn, Liverpool, Lancashire, United Kingdom. The ship was reflagged to the United Kingdom and registered at Liverpool. The United Kingdom Official Number 76476 was allocated. It was operated under the management of the Dominion Line of London. In 1878, the ship was sold to the Mississippi and Dominion Steamship Co, Liverpool. In November 1880, she caught fire at New Orleans, Louisiana, United States. In 1882, Teutonia was sold T Baker and registered at Cardiff, Glamorgan. It was sold back to the Mississippi and Dominion Steamship Co in 1884 and was sold later that year to Francesco Costa, Italy and renamed Regina. Renamed Piemontese in 1889 and Città di Savona in 1890; the ship was sold in 1891 to the Italian company Schiaffino and renamed Mentana''. The ship was scrapped in 1894 at La Spezia, Italy.

References

 

1856 ships
Ships built on the River Clyde
Merchant ships of the Hanseatic League
Steamships of the Hanseatic League
Merchant ships of Germany
Steamships of Germany
Maritime incidents in June 1860
Merchant ships of the United Kingdom
Steamships of the United Kingdom
Maritime incidents in December 1877
Maritime incidents in November 1880
Merchant ships of Italy
Steamships of Italy
Ships of the Hamburg America Line